Thirunaraiyur is a village in the Kumbakonam taluk of Thanjavur district, Tamil Nadu, India.

Demographics 

As per the 2001 census, Thirunaraiyur had a total population of 5698 with 2787 males and 2911 females. The sex ratio was 1044. The literacy rate was 75.95%.

References 

 

Villages in Thanjavur district